Alien Conflict is a play-by-mail game by Schubel & Son begun in 1983.

Gameplay
Alien Conflict was a play-by-mail computer-moderated game in which the players are part of the Kastron Sandpeople who abduct aliens from their worlds for arena combat. Players could use a custom character design or import one from Starmaster.

Reception
W.G. Armintrout reviewed Alien Conflict in Space Gamer No. 65. Armintrout commented that "Designing an alien is challenging, while actual play is beer-and-pretzels fun. Except for the high price, I can recommend Alien Conflict to everyone."

See also
 List of play-by-mail games

References

Play-by-mail games